Vitse-admiral Popov was a monitor built for the Imperial Russian Navy in the 1870s. It was one of the most unusual warships ever constructed, and still survives in popular naval lore as one of the worst warships ever built. The hull was circular to reduce draught while allowing the ship to carry much more armour and a heavier armament than other ships of the same size. Vitse-admiral Popov played a minor role in the Russo-Turkish War of 1877–78 and was reclassified as a coast-defence ironclad in 1892. The ship was decommissioned in 1903 and sold for scrap in 1911.

Background 
In 1868, the Scottish shipbuilder John Elder published an article that advocated that widening the beam of a ship would reduce the area that needed to be protected and allow it to carry thicker armour and heavier, more powerful guns in comparison to a normal ship. In addition such a ship would have a shallower draught and that only a moderate increase in power would be required to match the speed of the normal ship. Sir Edward Reed, then Director of Naval Construction of the Royal Navy, agreed with Elder's conclusions. Rear-Admiral Andrei Alexandrovich Popov of the Imperial Russian Navy further broadened Elder's concept by broadening the ship so that it was actually circular and he made the design flat-bottomed, unlike Elder's convex hull, to minimise its draught.

Popov's design was intended to meet an 1869 requirement to defend the Dnieper-Bug Estuary and the Kerch Strait. The requirement was for very heavily armoured ships of  draught and armed with  rifled guns, four of which should cost no more than four million rubles. The   met all of the requirements except that their armament was not powerful enough, so General-Admiral Grand Duke Konstantin Nikolayevich selected Popov's circular design in late December 1869. A model was built with a circular hull and performed well during tests in the Baltic Sea at St. Petersburg in April 1870; when Tsar Alexander II received reports of the trials, he nicknamed the ship a "popovka", after the designer.

Popov's initial design proved to be too grandiose and had to be scaled down. It was estimated to cost 1.94 million rubles per ship and the total cost of the programme, including improvements to the shipyards, would cost 8.5 million rubles. For further testing, the Kambala (Flounder), a circular ship  in diameter, was built in 1871. Equipped with two engines of eight nominal horsepower each, her trials during that summer were considered a success.

Vitse-admiral Popov was begun as the second ship of the class, after , but Popov took the opportunity, when construction of the ship was suspended shortly after it began, to massively enlarge the ship to accommodate larger, more powerful guns and heavier armour. The Tsar approved the new design on 25 August 1873 although construction did not resume immediately. He also renamed the ship from Kiev to Vitse-admiral Popov, after her designer, on 21 October.

Description 
The ship displaced  nearly 50% more at full load than did Novgorod although her freeboard remained . Like the earlier ship the deck curved upwards to the gun barbette in the center, but the barbette was entirely enclosed by a large unarmoured superstructure that included accommodations for an admiral and his staff. She had a crew of 19 officers and 187 ratings. Her bluff hull form meant that she lost speed in heavy weather and, in some conditions, the ship could pitch enough to place her propellers out of the water. The biggest drawback to her hull shape was that it greatly reduced the rudder's ability to turn the ship by masking much of the flow of water; so much so that it took 40–45 minutes to make a full circle and the ship was almost unsteerable in a severe storm. The solution adopted was to use the engines for steering and leave the rudder fixed, even though this reduced the ship's speed. During a Force 7 storm, Vitse-admiral Popovs captain wrote that: "the vessel took on a lot of water through the hatches in front of the ventilators... The steering wheel was torn out of [one's] hands, and the vessel did not answer the helm; it was necessary to steer by means of the engines, and to make fast the rudder."

The ship had eight vertical compound-expansion steam engines built by the Baird Works, using steam provided by twelve cylindrical boilers. The two inboard shafts were each driven by two engines, while the remaining four engines each powered a single propeller shaft. Vitse-admiral Popovs propulsion machinery proved problematic throughout her life as a result of defective workmanship and poor-quality materials. The ship had ventilation problems throughout her career, despite the later addition of a ventilation engine from the ironclad .

Vitse-admiral Popov was armed with two 20-calibre  rifled muzzle-loading guns. They were intended to use Moncrieff-type disappearing gun mounts that were elevated to fire and retracted below the top of the barbette to reload. The mounts were ordered from Britain, but tensions were at a high level in late 1876 and the Russians feared that the mounts would not be delivered on time. So scaled-up versions of the mounts used in Novgorod were built, although they proved not to be robust enough to handle the weight and recoil of the guns. Gunnery trials in October–November showed the weaknesses of the mounts and damaged the adjacent superstructure. Further trials were conducted in April 1877 and were deemed satisfactory by the navy, although naval personnel still considered the mounts too weak. Rear Admiral N. M. Chikhachev, commander of Odessa's naval defences during the Russo-Turkish War, reported that the guns could be fired at full power only "in case of extreme necessity". The British-built mounts were delivered in early 1878, but were not installed until late in the year. They were traversed by a pair of  steam engines that also powered the hydraulic systems that controlled recoil and elevation. Gunnery trials conducted in November showed that the system worked smoothly, although reloading time was around 14 minutes per gun. For protection against torpedo boats, four 4-pounder  guns were mounted near the funnels.

Popov nearly doubled the thickness of the armour on Vitse-admiral Popov compared to that on Novgorod. The outer belt armour was separated by 9 inches of teak reinforced by interlocking channel irons from the inner armour layer, which was itself backed by another 9 inches of teak and channel irons. The armour of the ship's barbette was identical to that of the upper strake of the belt armour.

Construction and career 
Unlike the earlier popovka, Novgorod, Vitse-admiral Popov (that has originally name Kyiv) was built at the Nikolaev Admiralty Shipyard. Construction began in January 1872, but was halted in mid-1872 when all of her workers were transferred to expedite the completion of Novgorod. Popov had already received approval to change the horizontal engines to vertical ones in March 1872 and decided to improve the ship based on the trials of Novgorod during the delay. The redesign meant that some of the work already completed had to be dismantled during late 1873 before construction began again in early 1874. The nominal keel-laying ceremony was on 8 September and she was launched on 7 October 1875. Vitse-admiral Popov was completed and entered service in 1876.

During the Russo-Turkish War, she was assigned to the defense of Odessa and her armament was reinforced by a pair of four-pounder guns mounted on the bridge wings. At some point early in her career, Vitse-admiral Popov was fitted with a telescoping spar torpedo. Together with Novgorod, the ship made a cruise to the Romanian town of Sulina on the Danube in mid-1878. Testing before the war revealed that the larger inboard propellers were more effective than the smaller outboard ones and that there was insufficient steam produced to supply all the engines, but the war delayed plans to remove the outermost pair until 1878. After the war the ship received armoured covers for her engine room skylight and the central barbette hatch to protect against plunging fire. In 1883, Vitse-admiral Popov was reboilered and her old boilers were refurbished and transferred to Novgorod.

She was reclassified as a coast-defence ironclad on 13 February 1892 by which time her armament had been augmented by two  quick-firing Hotchkiss five-barreled revolving cannon. By the following year her hull and machinery were in poor condition. The ship was turned over to the Port Authority of Nikolaev for disposal on 2 May 1903 and stricken from the navy list on 4 July. Vitse-admiral Popov was offered for sale to Bulgaria in 1908, but the offer was not taken up. The ship was sold for scrap in December 1911.

Myths and reality
In his book, The World's Worst Warships, naval historian Antony Preston characterised the popovkas like this: But in other respects, they were a dismal failure. They were too slow to stem the current in the Dniepr, and proved very difficult to steer. In practice the discharge of even one gun caused them to turn out of control and even contra-rotating some of six propellers was unable to keep the ship on the correct heading. Nor could they cope with the rough weather which is frequently encountered in the Black Sea. They were prone to rapid rolling and pitching in anything more than a flat calm, and could not aim or load their guns under such circumstances.

The design of these ships was very controversial while they were being built in the 1870s, with many articles being published in the newspapers of the day by supporters and detractors, and later picked up by historians. One such account, published in 1875, claimed that Novgorod made an uncontrollable turn while on the Dniepr, while Reed, describing a time when the ship's engines on one side were reversed during a cruise in Sevastopol Bay, wrote: "The circular form is so extremely favourable to this kind of handiness that the Novgorod can easily be revolved on her centre at a speed which quickly makes one giddy. She can, nevertheless, be promptly brought to rest, and, if, needed have her rotary motion reversed." It would seem probable that the two reports quoted above were combined into the story as given by Fred T. Jane: "On a trial cruise, they (Novgorod and Vitse-admiral Popov) went up the Dniepr very nicely for some distance, till they turned to retire. Then the current caught them, and they were carried out to sea, whirled helplessly round and round, every soul on board helplessly incapacitated by vertigo." The other criticisms made by Preston have been discussed earlier and the opinion of naval historian Stephen McLaughlin is a reasonable assessment of these ships: In the final analysis, the popovkas seem to have been relatively effective coast-defence vessels; certainly their combination of armament and armour could have only been carried by a conventional ship of much greater draught. Their faults – and they certainly had faults — were exaggerated by critics, both in Russia and abroad, and have left as a legacy stories of uncontrollable ships designed by incompetent men.

A detailed review of Russian circular ironclads has been made by Roffey in 1974 with photos and information available at that time [18]

Notes

Footnotes 

< 18 ^ Roffey, pp 218-239 />

Bibliography 

 
 Roffey, Clifford George(1974) "The Popoffkas" in Warship International, Vol 11, No 3, pages 218–239, Publisher International Naval Research Organization, ISSN 0043-0374

Further reading

External links

1875 ships
Naval ships of Russia
Ironclad warships of the Imperial Russian Navy
Ships built at Shipyard named after 61 Communards
Ships built in the Russian Empire